Stadium Majlis Perbandaran Temerloh or well known as Stadium Temerloh is a multi-purpose stadium located in Temerloh, Pahang, Malaysia. It is currently used mostly for football matches, with a capacity of 10,000 people. The stadium has a running track, in addition to the football field.

For the 2012 season, it is also the home for Pahang FA and Shahzan Muda FC football teams as Darulmakmur Stadium are currently unavailable due to major renovations.

Events hosted in the stadium
 Piala FAM 2010-NOW
 Final Piala Emas Raja-Raja 2011
 Liga Perdana 2012
 Pesta Bola Merdeka 2013

See also
 Sport in Malaysia

References

Sports venues in Pahang
Football venues in Malaysia
Athletics (track and field) venues in Malaysia
Multi-purpose stadiums in Malaysia
1997 establishments in Malaysia